The Tonalli River, a perennial river that is part of the Hawkesbury-Nepean catchment, is located in the Blue Mountains region of New South Wales, Australia.

Course and features
The Tonalli River rises on the eastern alopes of Mount Marrup within the Tonalli Range in remote country within the Greater Blue Mountains Area World Heritage Site, and flows generally east southeast, east northeast, and then east southeast, before reaching its confluence with the Wollondilly River within Lake Burragorang in Yerranderie State Conservation Area. The river descends  over its  course.

The river flows through parts of the Nattai and Kanangra-Boyd national parks and is a source of water for the Sydney region.

See also 

 List of rivers of New South Wales (L–Z)
 List of rivers of Australia
 Rivers of New South Wales

References

External links
 

Rivers of New South Wales
Rivers of the Blue Mountains (New South Wales)
Wollondilly Shire